Homalocalyx aureus is a member of the family Myrtaceae endemic to Western Australia.

It blooms between July and November producing yellow flowers.

It is found on sand plains in an area from the Mid West and into the northern Wheatbelt regions of Western Australia on sandy soils over laterite.

References

aureus
Endemic flora of Western Australia
Myrtales of Australia
Rosids of Western Australia
Plants described in 1987